John Charles Burkill  (1 February 1900,  Holt, Norfolk, England – 6 April 1993,  Sheffield, England) was an English mathematician who worked on analysis and introduced the Burkill integral. He was educated at St Paul's School and Trinity College, Cambridge. Burkill was elected a fellow of the Royal Society in 1953. In 1948, Burkill won the Adams Prize.  He was Master of Peterhouse until 1973. His doctoral students include Frederick Gehring.

Selected publications
 The Lebesgue Integral, Cambridge University Press 1951 2004 pbk edition
 The Theory of ordinary differential equations, Interscience, Oliver and Boyd 1956
 Mathematical Scholarship Problems, with H. M. Cundy, Cambridge University Press 1961
 First course in mathematical analysis, Cambridge University Press 1962; reprint of 1978 pbk edition 
 A second course in mathematical analysis, with Harry Burkill, Cambridge University Press, 1970; 1980 1st pbk edition; 2002 pbk edition

References

Alumni of Trinity College, Cambridge
Fellows of the Royal Society
Masters of Peterhouse, Cambridge
1900 births
1993 deaths
20th-century English mathematicians